Bella Kocharyan (born 31 January 1954, Stepanakert) is the wife of former Armenian President Robert Kocharyan and is the former First Lady of Armenia.

Kocharyan graduated the Yerevan Medical Institute's Sanitary-Hygienic Medicine Department in 1978. She worked first as a doctor-bacteriologist and then as a doctor-epidemiologist at the sanitary-epidemiological station in Nagorno-Karabakh. She also held the position of the deputy chief physician of the regional sanitary-epidemiological station and during her final years there (1991-1993) she headed a department at the station.

Currently, she is the Honorary President of the All-Armenian Bone Marrow Donor Registry and the Honorary President of the Armenian Branch of Vladimir Spivakov's international benevolent fund Talented Children of Armenia.

References 

1954 births
First ladies of Armenia
Living people
People from Stepanakert
Yerevan State Medical University alumni